Dik Davis (also called Dik Davies) was a drummer who played with English new wave bands like Fashion, Tin Tin and, as guest, Earl Grey.

Davis formed Fashion in 1978, alongside members Luke Sky on lead vocals and guitar and Mulligan on bass and keyboards. He and the latter remained in Fashion until 1984, when they split up. In 1983, he played as guest in Earl Grey, post-Fashion Luke Sky band.

He died in the mid-1990s. According to Luke Sky, he is “still to this day the best drummer I ever played with”.

References

English drummers
British male drummers
1990s deaths
Year of birth missing
Place of birth unknown